William Lawrence Snyder (February 14, 1918 – June 3, 1998) was an American film producer. He won an Academy Award for Best Animated Short in 1960 for the animation Munro. William Snyder created the company Rembrandt Films in Czechoslovakia, where animator Gene Deitch directed both his own films and cartoons outsourced from American studios such as MGM (Tom and Jerry), Columbia Pictures (UPA), 20th Century Fox (Terrytoons), Paramount (Nudnik), and King Features (Popeye).

Four of Rembrandt's short cartoons were nominated for the Academy Award for Best Animated Short Film between 1960 and 1964. One short, a short entitled Munro, told the story of a four-year-old boy drafted into the army, and won the 1960 Academy Award for Animated Short Film. Snyder produced the feature film Alice of Wonderland in Paris (1966).

Snyder died of Alzheimer's disease at the age of 80 in 1998.

Rembrandt Films is run today by his son, Adam Snyder, and his wife, Patricia Giniger Snyder.

References

External links 
 Rembrandt Films
 
 

1918 births
1998 deaths
American film producers
20th-century American businesspeople
People from Baltimore
American animated film producers
Producers who won the Best Animated Short Academy Award
Rembrandt Films
Deaths from dementia in New York (state)
Deaths from Alzheimer's disease
American expatriates in the Czech Republic